Emory Bernard Elliott (October 30, 1942 – March 31, 2009) was an American professor of American literature at UC Riverside.

Elliott was known in particular for advocating the expansion of the literary canon to include a more diverse range of voices.

Childhood and education

Elliott came from a working-class background in Baltimore, Md., and was the first in his family to earn a college degree. After earning his bachelor's in English from Loyola College on a Reserve Officers' Training Corps (ROTC) scholarship, he received a master's from Bowling Green State University. He served in the Army at Fort Sill in Oklahoma and was an instructor at the U.S. Military Academy in West Point, N.Y., before going on to earn a PhD from the University of Illinois.

Professional career
Early on in his career he focused on early American Literature, publishing two seminal works on the topic: Power and the Pulpit in Puritan New England in 1975 and Revolutionary Writers: Literature and Authority in the New Republic in 1982. In 1988, he edited the controversial and groundbreaking Columbia Literary History of the United States, the first major multicultural anthology of American literature.

According to reports in the New York Times, Elliott, along with Valerie Smith, Margaret Doody, and Sandra Gilbert all resigned from Princeton in 1989.  The reports suggest that the four were unhappy with the leniency shown to Thomas McFarland after he was accused of sexual misconduct.  McFarland was initially put on a one-year suspension, but eventually took early retirement after these resignations and threats of student boycotts.

He joined University of California, Riverside in 1989, and in 2001 was named a University Professor, a designation of a small number (36) top scholars and teachers in the University of California system that grants them access to all campuses.

He directed UC Riverside's Center for Ideas and Society from 1996, enhancing the reputation of the institute and its scope by winning grants from foundations.

His most significant professional appointments were at Princeton University, where he worked for 17 years, serving at various points as the chairman of the American Studies program and the English Department. There he also received the university's Distinguished Service Award for his work on the Women's Studies Program.

He was appointed to many academic societies including the National Endowment for the Humanities, the American Council of Learned Societies, Guggenheim, the National Humanities Center, and the Institute for the Humanities at the University of California, Irvine. He was president of the American Studies Association in 2006–07.

Personal life

Elliott's wife, Georgia, worked in fund-raising at UC-Riverside and is now retired. Two of his five children also are college professors.

Awards
 1989 American Book Award for Columbia Literary History of the United States

Bibliography

References

External links 
"Emory Elliott, My Friend, 1942-2009", HASTAC, Cathy Davidson, April 02, 2009

1942 births
2009 deaths
University of California, Riverside faculty
American Book Award winners
United States Army officers
United States Military Academy faculty
Princeton University faculty
University of Illinois Urbana-Champaign alumni
Bowling Green State University alumni